Reuterwanne is a 1541 m high mountain in the Allgäu Alps near Wertach and Jungholz. Due to its secluded location, the view from the top goes very far.

References

Mountains of the Alps
Allgäu Alps
Mountains of Bavaria
One-thousanders of Germany
Oberallgäu